Trenton Marcus Grisham (né Clark; born November 1, 1996) is an American professional baseball outfielder for the San Diego Padres of Major League Baseball (MLB). He previously played for the Milwaukee Brewers, who selected him in the first round (15th pick) of the 2015 MLB draft. He made his MLB debut in 2019.

Career
Grisham attended Richland High School in North Richland Hills, Texas. He played baseball and was on the football team as a freshman. He hit .441 with ten home runs as a junior and .552 with three home runs as a senior. Playing with the 18-under Team USA team during the summer after his junior year, Grisham hit .538 with a .923 slugging percentage, 24 runs batted in (RBI) and ten stolen bases over 12 games. He committed to Texas Tech University to play college baseball.

Grisham was considered one of the top prospects for the 2015 Major League Baseball draft.

Milwaukee Brewers

He was selected by the Milwaukee Brewers as the 15th pick in the first round, signed with them, was assigned to the Arizona League Brewers, and was later promoted to the Helena Brewers; in 55 total games between both teams, he posted a .309 batting average with two home runs, 21 RBIs and a .854 OPS. Grisham spent 2016 with the Wisconsin Timber Rattlers where he batted .231 with two home runs and 24 RBIs in only 59 games due to hamstring injuries. 

In 2017, he played for the Carolina Mudcats, posting a .223 batting average with eight home runs, 45 RBIs and 37 stolen bases in 133 games. In 2018 he played with the Biloxi Shuckers, hitting .233 with seven home runs, 31 RBIs, and 11 stolen bases in 107 games. Grisham opened the 2019 season with the San Antonio Missions.

On August 1, 2019, the Brewers selected Grisham's contract and promoted him to the major leagues. He made his major league debut that day versus the Oakland Athletics.

San Diego Padres
On November 27, 2019, the Brewers traded Grisham, Zach Davies, and cash considerations or a player to be named later to the San Diego Padres in exchange for Luis Urías and Eric Lauer.

On August 22, 2020, Grisham had his first career multi-home run game, hitting homers in the first and second innings against Brandon Bielak of the Houston Astros. In the seventh inning, Grisham hit his third home run of the game against Joe Biagini, his first career three-homer game and first Padres three-homer game since Hunter Renfroe had done so on June 14, 2019.

Grisham finished the shortened 2020 season hitting .251/.352/.456 with 10 home runs and 26 RBIs in 59 games. He also led NL outfielders with 134 putouts and won the National League Gold Glove Award as a center fielder.

Grisham began the 2021 season on the IL with a hamstring strain he suffered early in spring training, but he rejoined the team on April 9.  He also missed 20 games in the middle of the season with a left heel bruise.  Grisham was the Padres everyday center fielder, starting 118 games there in 2021.  For the season, he batted .242/.327/.413 with 15 home runs, 62 RBIs and 13 stolen bases in 132 games.  He batted in the leadoff position in 52 of his starts.

In 2022 he had the lowest batting average in the majors, hitting .184/.284/.341 in 451 at bats. He led the major leagues in sacrifice hits, with seven.

On January 13, 2023, Grisham agreed to a one-year, $3.175 million contract with the Padres, avoiding salary arbitration.

Personal life
Grisham was born and grew up in Fort Worth, Texas. His first legal name was Trenton Marcus Clark. He changed his last name in 2017 to Grisham, which is his mother's last name.

Grisham is married to Megan Grisham, and he follows the Christian faith.

References

External links

1996 births
Living people
Baseball players from Fort Worth, Texas
People from North Richland Hills, Texas
Major League Baseball outfielders
African-American baseball players
Milwaukee Brewers players
San Diego Padres players
Arizona League Brewers players
Helena Brewers players
Wisconsin Timber Rattlers players
Carolina Mudcats players
Biloxi Shuckers players
San Antonio Missions players
Peoria Javelinas players
21st-century African-American sportspeople
Gold Glove Award winners